Selastele kopua is a species of sea snail, a marine gastropod mollusk in the family Calliostomatidae.

Description

Distribution
This marine species occurs off New Zealand.

References

 Bruce A. Marshall, Deep-sea Gastropods from the New Zealand Region Associated with Recent Whale Bones and an Eocene Turtle; The Nautilus 108 (1) (1994)

kopua
Gastropods described in 1995